The Aggreko Power Station (2003-2012) was a temporary 20-megawatt fuel oil-fired power station in Sri Lanka. It was commissioned in October 2003 after power generation company Aggreko won an open bid offered by the Ceylon Electricity Board to overcome the Sri Lanka energy crisis faced in the 1990s to early 2000s. It was decommissioned on 31 December 2012.

See also 
 List of power stations in Sri Lanka

References

External links 
 
 
 
 
 

Oil-fired power stations in Sri Lanka
Buildings and structures in Jaffna District
Former power stations in Sri Lanka